This is a list of middle schools in the U.S. state of Hawaii.

Honolulu

Public

Private 
Damien Memorial School, Honolulu
Hawaii Baptist Academy, Honolulu
Iolani School, Honolulu
Kamehameha Schools, Honolulu
Maryknoll School, Honolulu
Mid-Pacific Institute, Honolulu
Punahou School, Honolulu
Sacred Hearts Academy, Honolulu
Saint Louis School, Honolulu

Greater Oʻahu

Public

Private 
Honolulu Waldorf School, Kahala
Le Jardin Academy, Kailua

Niʻihau

Kauaʻi

Public

Private 
Island School, Līhuʻe
Kahili Adventist School, Koloa

Molokaʻi

Lānaʻi 
The only school in Lānaʻi is Lānaʻi High & Elementary School.

Maui

Public

Private 
Seabury Hall College Preparatory School, Makawao
Kamehameha Schools Maui Campus, Pukalani

Big Island

Public

Private 
Hawaii Academy of Arts and Sciences, Pāhoa
Hawaiʻi Preparatory Academy, Kamuela
Hualalai Academy, Kailua Kona
Kamehameha Schools Hawaii Campus, Keaʻau
Ke Kula ʻo Nāwahīokalaniʻōpuʻu, Keaʻau
Parker School, Kamuela
St. Joseph Junior/Senior High School, Hilo

See also 
List of high schools in Hawaii
List of elementary schools in Hawaii
Hawaiʻi State Department of Education, sole centralized school district for the state

External links 
List of middle schools in Hawaiʻi from SchoolTree.org
Hawaiʻi Department of Education list of public schools

Middle
Hawaii